The attack on Mers-el-Kébir (Battle of Mers-el-Kébir) on 3 July 1940, during the Second World War, was a British naval attack on French Navy ships at the naval base at Mers El Kébir, near Oran, on the coast of French Algeria. The attack was the main part of Operation Catapult, a British plan to neutralise or destroy French ships to prevent them from falling into German hands after the Allied defeat in the Battle of France. The British bombardment of the base killed 1,297 French servicemen, sank a battleship and damaged five other ships, for a British loss of five aircraft shot down and two crewmen killed.

The attack by air and sea was conducted by the Royal Navy, after France had signed armistices with Germany and Italy, coming into effect on 25 June. The British War Cabinet feared that the ships would fall into Axis hands. Admiral François Darlan, commander of the French Navy, assured the British, even after the French armistices with Germany and Italy, that the fleet would remain under French control, but Winston Churchill and the War Cabinet judged that the risk was too great. Darlan repeatedly refused British requests to place the fleet in British custody or move it to the French West Indies, out of German reach.

The British attack was condemned in France as an attack on an allied nation and resentment festered for years over what was considered betrayal by a former ally. The French thought that their assurances were honourable and should have been sufficient. Marshal Philippe Pétain, who was appointed the Prime Minister of France on 16 June, severed diplomatic relations with the United Kingdom on 8 July. 

French aircraft retaliated by bombing Gibraltar and French ships exchanged fire several times with British ships, before a tacit truce was observed in the western Mediterranean. On 27 November 1942, after the beginning of Operation Torch, the Allied invasion of French North Africa, the French Navy foiled Case Anton, a German and Italian operation to capture its ships at Toulon, by scuttling them. In 1997, Martin Thomas wrote that the British attack at Mers-el Kébir remains controversial but that other historians have written that it demonstrated to the world that Britain would fight on.

Background

French–German armistice

After the Fall of France in 1940 and the armistice between France and Nazi Germany, the British War Cabinet was apprehensive about control over the French navy. The French and German navies combined could alter the balance of power at sea, threatening British imports over the Atlantic and communications with the rest of the British Empire. In Article 8, Paragraph 2 of the Armistice terms, the German government "solemnly and firmly declared that it had no intention of making demands regarding the French fleet during the peace negotiations" and there were similar terms in the armistice with Italy but they were considered by the British to be no guarantee of the neutralisation of the French fleet. On 24 June, Darlan assured Winston Churchill against such a possibility. Churchill ordered that a demand be made that the French Navy should either join with the Royal Navy or be neutralised in a manner guaranteed to prevent the ships falling into Axis hands.

At Italian suggestion, the armistice terms were amended to permit the French fleet temporarily to stay in North African ports, where they might be seized by Italian troops from Libya. The British made a contingency plan, Operation Catapult, to eliminate the French fleet in mid-June, when it was clear that Philippe Pétain was forming a government with a view to ending the war and it seemed likely that the French fleet might be seized by the Germans. In a speech to Parliament, Churchill repeated that the Armistice of 22 June 1940 was a betrayal of the Allied agreement not to make a separate peace. Churchill said, "What is the value of that? Ask half a dozen countries; what is the value of such a solemn assurance?... Finally, the armistice could be voided at any time on any pretext of non-observance...".

The French fleet had seen little fighting during the Battle of France and was mostly intact. By tonnage, about 40 per cent was in Toulon, near Marseilles, 40 per cent in French North Africa and 20 per cent in Britain, Alexandria and the French West Indies. Although Churchill feared the fleet would be used by the Axis, the need to man, maintain and arm the French ships with items that were incompatible with German and Italian equipments made this unlikely. The  and Benito Mussolini made overtures but Adolf Hitler feared that an attempted take-over would provoke the French fleet into defecting to the British. Churchill and Hitler viewed the fleet as a potential threat; the French leaders used the fleet (and the possibility of its rejoining the Allies) as a bargaining counter against the Germans to keep them out of unoccupied France (the ) and French North Africa. The armistice was contingent on the French right to man their vessels and the French Navy Minister, Admiral François Darlan, had ordered the Atlantic fleet to Toulon and to demobilise, with orders to scuttle the ships if the Germans tried to take them.

British–French negotiations
The British tried to persuade the French authorities in North Africa to continue the war or to hand over the fleet to British control. A British admiral visited Oran on 24 June, and Duff Cooper, Minister of Information, visited Casablanca on 27 June. The French Atlantic ports were in German hands and the British needed to keep the German surface fleet out of the Mediterranean, confine the Italian fleet to the Mediterranean and to blockade ports still under French control. The Admiralty was against an attack on the French fleet in case the ships were not sufficiently damaged, France declared war and the French colonies would be less likely to defect. The Royal Navy lacked the ships to permanently blockade the French naval bases in North Africa and keep the Atlantic approaches open, which made the risk of the Germans or the Italians seizing the French capital ships too great. Because the fleet in Toulon was well guarded by shore artillery, the Royal Navy decided to attack the base in North Africa.

Ultimatum

Admiral James Somerville, commander of Force H, based in Gibraltar, was ordered to deliver an ultimatum to the French, the terms of which were contrary to the German–French armistice. Somerville passed the duty of presenting the ultimatum to a French speaker, Captain Cedric Holland, commander of the carrier . Gensoul was affronted that negotiations were being conducted by a less-senior officer and sent his lieutenant, Bernard Dufay, which led to much delay and confusion. As the negotiations continued, it became clear that agreement was unlikely. The French made preparations for action and 42 aircraft were armed and made ready for take-off. Darlan was at home on 3 July and could not be contacted; Gensoul told the French government that the alternatives were internment or battle but omitted the option of sailing to the French West Indies. Removing the fleet to U. S. waters had formed part of the orders given by Darlan to Gensoul in the event that a foreign power should attempt to seize his ships.

Operation Catapult

Plymouth and Alexandria

Along with French vessels in metropolitan ports, some had sailed to ports in Britain or to Alexandria in Egypt. Operation Catapult was an attempt to take these ships under British control or destroy them. The French ships berthed in Plymouth and Portsmouth were boarded without warning on the night of 3 July. The submarine , the largest in the world, had been at Plymouth for the last month. The crew resisted a boarding party and three Royal Navy personnel, including two officers, were killed, along with a French sailor. The French squadron in Alexandria (Admiral René-Émile Godfroy) including the battleship , the heavy cruiser  and three modern light cruisers, was neutralised by local agreement.

Attack on Mers-el-Kébir

The British had the advantage of being able to manoeuvre, while the French fleet was anchored in a narrow harbour and its crews did not expect an attack. The main armament of Dunkerque and Strasbourg was forward of the superstructure and could not immediately be brought to bear. The British capital ships had  guns and fired a heavier broadside than the French battleships. On 3 July, before negotiations were formally terminated, six British Fairey Swordfish planes escorted by three Blackburn Skuas from Ark Royal dropped magnetic mines in the harbour exit. The force was intercepted by five French Curtiss H-75 fighters which shot down a Skua into the sea with the loss of its two crew, the only British fatalities in the action.

French warships were ordered from Algiers and Toulon as reinforcements but did not reach Mers-El-Kebir in time. At 5:54 p.m., the four submarines received orders to put to sea. The third British salvo scored hits and a magazine aboard Bretagne exploded, the ship sinking with 977 of her crew at  After thirty salvoes, the French ships stopped firing; the British force altered course to avoid return fire from the French coastal forts but Provence, Dunkerque, the destroyer  and two other destroyers were damaged; their crews ran them aground to prevent them from sinking. Four French Morane-Saulnier M.S.406 fighters arrived, outnumbering the British Skuas. Three more Curtiss fighters appeared and there was another engagement. The four French submarines were unable to close with the British warships.

Strasbourg, three destroyers and one gunboat managed to avoid the mines and escape to the open sea, under attack from a flight of bomb-armed Swordfish from Ark Royal. The French ships responded with anti-aircraft fire and shot down two Swordfish, the crews being rescued by the destroyer ; a French flying boat also bombed a British destroyer. As the British bombing had little effect, at  Somerville ordered his ships to pursue. Hood also fired several 15 in shells at Rigault de Genouilly, and the French ship fired nineteen  shells in response before being hit by Enterprise and withdrawing. Meanwhile, a British aircraft sighted Danaé and Eurydice shortly before 8:00 p.m. and dropped illuminated floats to guide a British destroyer to them. The destroyer depth-charged the two submarines but they escaped without damage. At  Somerville called off the pursuit, feeling that his ships were ill-deployed for a night engagement. After another ineffective Swordfish attack at  Strasbourg reached Toulon on 4 July.

During the night of 3/4 July 1940, Ariane, Danaé, Diane and Eurydice patrolled on the surface off Oran in a north–south patrol line and they remained on patrol off Oran until 8:00 p.m. on 4 July before returning to Oran. On 4 July, the British submarine  encountered Rigault de Genouilly off the Algerian coast, mistook her for a cruiser and sank her. The French Air Force made reprisal raids on Gibraltar, including a small night attack on 5 July, when many bombs landed in the sea.

Actions of 8 July

The British believed that the damage inflicted on Dunkerque and Provence was not serious and on the morning of 8 July raided Mers-el-Kébir again in Operation Lever, with Swordfish aircraft from Ark Royal. A torpedo hit the patrol boat Terre-Neuve, moored alongside Dunkerque, full of depth charges. Terre-Neuve quickly sank and the depth charges went off, causing serious damage to the battleship. Another attack took place on 8 July, when aircraft from the carrier  attacked the Richelieu at Dakar, seriously damaging it. When word of the events at Dakar reached Oran, the French submarines Ariane, Diane, and Eurydice got back underway on 8 July to form a patrol line off Cape Falcon, Algeria, in case of another British attack on Oran, but the submarines encountered no British forces.

Aftermath

Analysis

Churchill wrote, "This was the most hateful decision, the most unnatural and painful in which I have ever been concerned". Relations between Britain and France were severely strained for some time and the Germans enjoyed a propaganda coup. Somerville said that it was "the biggest political blunder of modern times and will rouse the whole world against us... we all feel thoroughly ashamed...". The attack revived Anglophobia in France, demonstrated British resolve to continue the war and rallied the British Conservative Party around Churchill (Neville Chamberlain, Churchill's predecessor as prime minister, was still party leader). The British action showed the world that defeat in France had not reduced the determination of the government to fight on and ambassadors in Mediterranean countries reported favourable reactions.

The French ships in Alexandria under the command of Admiral René-Emile Godfroy, including the old battleship Lorraine and four cruisers, were blockaded by the British on 3 July and offered the same terms as at Mers-el-Kébir. After delicate negotiations, conducted on the part of the British by Admiral Andrew Cunningham, Godfroy agreed on 7 July to disarm his fleet and stay in port until the end of the war. Some sailors joined the Free French while others were repatriated to France; the ships at Alexandria went on to be used by the Free French after May 1943. The British attacks on French vessels in port increased tension between Churchill and Charles de Gaulle, who was recognised by the British as the leader of the Free French Forces on 28 June 1940.

According to his principal private secretary, Eric Seal, "[Churchill] was convinced that the Americans were impressed by ruthlessness in dealing with a ruthless foe; and in his mind the American reaction to our attack on the French fleet in Oran was of the first importance". On 4 July, Roosevelt told the French ambassador that he would have done the same. Jean Lacouture, in a biography of De Gaulle, blamed the tragedy mainly on miscommunication; if Darlan had been in contact on the day or if Somerville had possessed a more diplomatic character, a deal might have been done. Lacouture accepted that there was a danger that the French ships might have been captured by German or more likely Italian troops, which was proven by the ease with which the British seized French ships in British ports or the Germans seized French ships in Bizerte in Tunisia in November 1942.

In 2004, David Brown wrote that foreign opinion was generally favourable to Operation Catapult and that the demonstration of British determination had succeeded. In 2010, Colin Smith wrote that the attack was the first big triumph of Churchill's premiership and that they had been received favourably by the governments of the US, Turkey, Greece and Brazil, with condemnation from Spain and Switzerland. Count Galeazzo Ciano, the Italian foreign minister, made a diary entry that the RN retained the "ruthlessness of the captains and pirates of the C16th".

Casualties

Subsequent events

British–Vichy hostilities
Following the 3 July operation, Darlan ordered the French fleet to attack Royal Navy ships wherever possible; Pétain and his foreign minister Paul Baudouin over-ruled the order the next day. Military retaliation was conducted by ineffective air raids on Gibraltar but Baudouin noted that "the attack on our fleet is one thing, war is another". As sceptics had warned, there were also complications with the French empire; when French colonial forces defeated de Gaulle's Free French Forces at the Battle of Dakar in September 1940, Germany responded by permitting Vichy France to maintain its remaining ships armed, rather than demobilised. On 24 September Gibraltar was bombed by sixty Vichy French aircraft which dropped  of bombs and that night, 81 bombers dropped  of bombs. Hotspur returned fire but this was not reported by the French ships.

On 27 September Force H stayed at sea after receiving "a charming message [that] the whole of the Toulon fleet was coming out to have a scrap with us" but the two navies adhered to a tacit understanding that the British did not attack more powerful French forces at sea or ships in port but intercepted other French ships:

In the autumn, the French sent a convoy through the Strait of Gibraltar untroubled, a state of affairs that rarely changed during the Mediterranean Campaign.

Gibraltarian civilians

In early June 1940, about 13,500 civilians had been evacuated from Gibraltar to Casablanca in French Morocco.  Following the capitulation of the French to the Germans and the attack on Mers-el-Kébir, the Vichy government found their presence an embarrassment. Later in June, 15 British cargo vessels arrived in Casablanca under Commodore Crichton, repatriating 15,000 French servicemen who had been rescued from Dunkirk. Once the French troops had disembarked, the ships were interned until the Commodore agreed to take away the evacuees, who, reflecting tensions generated after the attack on Mers-el-Kébir, were escorted to the ships at bayonet point, minus many of their possessions.

Case Anton

On 19 November 1942, the Germans tried to capture the French fleet based at Toulon, against the armistice terms, as part of Case Anton, the military occupation of Vichy France by Germany. All ships of any military value were scuttled by the French before the arrival of German troops, notably Dunkerque, Strasbourg and seven (four heavy and three light) modern cruisers. For many in the French Navy this was a final proof that there had never been a question of their ships ending up in German hands and that the British action at Mers-el-Kébir had been unnecessary. Darlan was true to his promise in 1940, that French ships would not be allowed to fall into German hands. Godfroy, still in command of the French ships neutralised at Alexandria, remained aloof for a while longer but on 17 May 1943 joined the Allies.

Orders of battle
Royal Navy

  – battlecruiser – Flagship
  – battleship
  – battleship
  – aircraft carrier
  – light cruiser
  – light cruiser
  – destroyer
  – destroyer
  – destroyer
  – destroyer
  – destroyer
  – destroyer
  – destroyer
  – destroyer
  – destroyer
  – destroyer
  – destroyer

French Navy (Marine Nationale)
  – battleship – Flagship
  – battleship
  – battleship
  – battleship
  – seaplane tender
  – destroyer
  – destroyer
  – destroyer
  – destroyer
  – destroyer
  – destroyer
  – submarine
  – submarine
  – submarine
  – submarine

See also
 Attack on Pearl Harbor
 Battle of Taranto
 Naval Battle of Casablanca

Notes

Footnotes

References

Books

Journals

Further reading

External links

 A plan of the Mers-el-Kébir anchorage, hmshood.org.uk
 Mers-El-Kebir (1979) a French made-for-TV movie
 Churchill's Sinking of the French Fleet (3 July 1940), digitalsurvivors.com
 Churchill's Deadly Decision, episode of Secrets of the Dead describing the attack and the events leading up to it
 Kappes, Irwin J. (2003) Mers-el-Kebir: A Battle between Friends, Military History Online
 Waghorne, Richard (2020) The Most Hateful Decision: Honour, Power, and Will at Mers-el-Kébir, The Critic

Conflicts in 1940
Battle of the Mediterranean
British violations of the rights of neutral nations during World War II
Mers-el-Kébir
Algeria in World War II
1940 in France
Naval battles of World War II involving France
Naval history of World War II
France–United Kingdom military relations
July 1940 events